Governor Mathews or Matthews may refer to:

George Mathews (Georgia) (1739–1812), 16th Governor of Georgia
Henry M. Mathews (1830s–1884), 5th Governor of West Virginia
John Mathews (lawyer) (1744–1802), 33rd Governor of South Carolina
Samuel Mathews (Colonial Virginia governor) (1630–1660), Commonwealth Governor of Virginia from 1656 to 1660
Claude Matthews (1845–1898), 23rd Governor of Indiana
Joseph W. Matthews (1812–1862), 15th Governor of Mississippi

See also
Edward Mathew (1729–1805), Governor of Grenada from 1782 to c. 1797